Sindo (stylized in capitals as SINDO) is an Indonesian flagship news programme which broadcast on Sindo TV. Its slogan is Referensi Indonesia (Indonesian Reference).  The show contains news material from within and outside the country, including material from Koran Sindo and Sindo correspondents throughout Indonesia.

References

External links 
  Official Site
  Sindo TV site

Indonesian television news shows
Indonesian-language television shows

2011 Indonesian television series debuts
2010s Indonesian television series
2015 Indonesian television series endings